The 1980 All-Ireland Minor Football Championship was the 49th staging of the All-Ireland Minor Football Championship, the Gaelic Athletic Association's premier inter-county Gaelic football tournament for boys under the age of 18.

Dublin entered the championship as defending champions, however, they were defeated in the Leinster Championship.

On 21 September 1980, Kerry won the championship following a 3-12 to 0-11 defeat of Derry in the All-Ireland final. This was their ninth All-Ireland title and their first title in five championship seasons.

Results

Connacht Minor Football Championship

Quarter-Finals

Semi-Finals

Final

Leinster Minor Football Championship

Preliminary Round

Quarter-Finals

Semi-Finals

Final

Munster Minor Football Championship

Quarter-Finals

Semi-Finals

Final

Ulster Minor Football Championship

Preliminary Round

Quarter-Finals

Semi-Finals

Final

All-Ireland Minor Football Championship

Semi-Finals

Final

References

1980
All-Ireland Minor Football Championship